Hashem Jawad (‎; 1911 in Baghdad – 1969 in Beirut) was an Iraqi  Foreign Minister  from 1959 to 1963.

References

1911 births
1969 deaths
Iraqi diplomats
Foreign ministers of Iraq
People from Baghdad